The Calgary Mustangs were a junior A ice hockey team in the Alberta Junior Hockey League (AJHL).  They played in Calgary, Alberta, Canada at the Father David Bauer Olympic Arena. They were known as the Calgary Royals from 1990 until 2010. On May 4, 2019, it was announced that the Mustangs had elected to take a leave of absence for the 2019–20 season.

History

The franchise began play in the 1972–73 season as The Pass Red Devils based in Crowsnest Pass, Alberta. The Red Devils franchise lasted four years before relocating to the nearby community of Pincher Creek to become the Pincher Creek Panthers.  The team lasted two seasons in Pincher Creek before relocating to Calgary to become the Calgary Chinooks.  In 1979–80, under a new ownership group, the Chinooks became the Calgary Spurs.

Following the 1989–90 season, the Spurs ceased operations, leaving the AJHL with just seven franchises. The league opted to keep a second Calgary-based franchise along with the Calgary Canucks, and sold a new franchise to four local businessmen who named it the Calgary Jr. "A" Royals with the mandate of providing Calgary and area kids with the opportunity to combine a high level of hockey with a quality education.

The Royals were immediately successful, finishing second in the regular season standings, behind the Fort Saskatchewan Traders and winning the league championship in their first season. The Royals were unable to duplicate that success, as the team failed to make it past the second round of the playoffs since winning the title.

Faced with the challenges of sharing a market with the National Hockey League, Western Hockey League, and another AJHL team, the Royals were supported through corporate partnerships and volunteers. Seeking to distinguish itself from the city's minor hockey program of the same name, the franchise renamed itself the Mustangs prior to the 2010–11 season.

After several seasons of struggling financially, the Mustangs were granted a leave of absence for the 2019–20 season.

The Mustangs are approved to move to Blackfalds, Alberta for the 2021–22 season, after being sold to Doug Quinn.

Season-by-season record
Note: GP = Games played, W = Wins, L = Losses, T/OTL = Ties/Overtime losses, SOL = Shootout losses, Pts = Points, GF = Goals for, GA = Goals against

NHL alumni
Some of the players that played on the Royals that went on to play in the NHL include:
 T. J. Galiardi
 Cale Hulse
 Krystofer Kolanos
 Tyler Sloan
 Jay Beagle
  Brandon Kozun

See also
List of ice hockey teams in Alberta
Ice hockey in Calgary
Calgary Buffaloes (AJHL)
Calgary Cowboys (AJHL)

References

External links
Alberta Junior Hockey League website
Calgary Mustangs website
Calgary Royals website

Alberta Junior Hockey League teams
Royals, Calgary
Ice hockey teams in Alberta
Ice hockey clubs established in 1990
1990 establishments in Alberta